The Chief Economist of the World Bank (full title: Senior Vice President for Development Economics and Chief Economist of the World Bank Group) is the senior economist at the World Bank Group, tasked with providing intellectual leadership and direction to the Bank’s overall international development strategy and economic research agenda, at global, regional and country levels.

As a member of the Bank’s senior management team, the person advises the President and Bank’s management on economic issues.

List of Chief Economists of the World Bank

See also
Chief Economist of the International Monetary Fund

References